Inozemtsevo is an urban locality (a settlement) under the administrative jurisdiction of the town of oblast significance of Zheleznovodsk in Stavropol Krai, Russia. Population:

References

Urban-type settlements in Stavropol Krai